The Wave is a British game show which premiered on 15 January 2018 until 19 March 2018, as a ten-part series on W. It is hosted by Rylan Clark-Neal with Keri-anne Payne overseeing the contestants. The concept of the show is that teams consisting of two members would enter the show together. One of the team members would be in the sea whilst the other will stay on land. The teammate in the sea will swim to pontoons to answer questions to win a cash prize. If they got an answer wrong, they would get weighed down by rocks.

Transmissions

References

7. On BIG game show 'Im-poster', Kerri-Anne Payne was depicted by voice by impressionist Lizzie Stanford. This was used in the promotional trailer for the BIG series.

External links

2018 British television series debuts
2018 British television series endings
English-language television shows
UKTV original programming
2010s British game shows
Television game shows with incorrect disambiguation